Every Heart a Doorway is a fantasy novella by American writer Seanan McGuire, the first in the Wayward Children series. It was first published in hardcover and ebook editions by Tor.com in April 2016.

Plot 
Rarely, children may find doorways that transport them to other worlds. As a child, Nancy found a doorway that led her to the land of the dead, based on the story of Persephone and Hades. When she is returned to the real world, her parents do not believe her story. Nancy is sent to a boarding school for children who have had similar experiences.

The students include Kade, who spent time in a fantasy world with goblins and fairies, Jacqueline "Jack" and Jillian "Jill," who spent time in a world of vampires and mad scientists, and Sumi, who spent time in a nonsense world full of candy and rainbows. The students were all altered by their time in different worlds where they were able to be their true selves, and most long to return to them.

Sumi is found dead, as are several other students. Nancy and her friends learn that Jill is killing students in order to make a key which will reopen her own doorway. Jack kills Jill and then returns to her gothic world. Nancy finds her doorway again and returns to the land of the dead.

Reception and awards 
Every Heart a Doorway was critically acclaimed upon release, and received the following accolades:

 2017 Hugo Award for Best Novella 
2016 Nebula Award for Best Novella 
 2017 Locus Award for Best Novella 
 2017 Alex Award

Series 
The book is the first in an open sequence of novellas and short stories called the Wayward Children.

Film 
In July 2021, Paramount Pictures acquired the film rights to the Wayward Children series.

References 

Novels by Seanan McGuire
American novellas
2016 American novels
2016 fantasy novels
American fantasy novels
Hugo Award for Best Novella winning works
Nebula Award for Best Novella-winning works
Tor Books books